Carlos Thompson (born February 16, 1992) is a former American football outside linebacker. He was signed by the Houston Texans as an undrafted free agent in 2015. He played college football at Ole Miss as a defensive end.

Professional career

Houston Texans
Thompson signed with the Houston Texans after going undrafted in the 2015 NFL Draft.

On August 30, 2016, Thompson was waived by the Texans.

Los Angeles Rams
On April 5, 2017, Thompson signed with the Los Angeles Rams. He was waived on September 2, 2017 and was signed to the Rams' practice squad the next day. He was promoted to the active roster on December 2, 2017.

On May 14, 2018, Thompson was waived/injured by the Rams and placed on injured reserve. He was released on October 3, 2018.

References

External links
Ole Miss Rebels bio

1992 births
Living people
American football linebackers
People from Hollandale, Mississippi
Players of American football from Mississippi
Ole Miss Rebels football players
Houston Texans players
Los Angeles Rams players